International Convention Relating to Intervention on the High Seas in Cases of Oil Pollution Casualties 1969 (INTERVENTION 1969) is an international maritime convention affirming the right of a coastal State to "take such measures on the high seas as may be necessary to prevent, mitigate or eliminate grave and imminent danger to their coastline or related interests from pollution or threat of pollution of the sea by oil, following upon a maritime casualty or acts related to such a casualty".

History
The 1967 Torrey Canyon disaster when the oil spilled from the tanker severely damaged coastal and marine environment and wildlife of the coastal State signalled a need to empower coastal State to take necessary measures to protect itself from pollution incidents outside this State's territory, i.e. on the high seas. In doing so, it was also deemed necessary to protect the legitimate interests of ship-owners, cargo owners and the flag States and the principle of the freedom of the high seas.

The new Convention was drafted within the framework of the International Maritime Organization (IMO) and adopted at the international conference in Brussels, Belgium in 1969 entering into force in 1975. In 1973, the Protocol relating to Intervention on the High Seas in Cases of Marine Pollution by Substances other than Oil was adopted extending the provision of the 1969 Convention to other hazardous substances. The list of hazardous substances covered by Protocol was amended and extended in 1991, 1996 and 2002.

As of October 2016, the convention has 89 state parties.

Summary of Provisions 
The Convention applies to all seagoing vessels except warships or other vessels owned or operated by a State and used on Government non-commercial service.

While exercising the right to take measures "necessary to prevent, mitigate or eliminate grave and imminent danger to their coastline or related interests" from oil pollution, the coastal State is obligated to:

 Prior to taking measures to consult other affected States, including the flag State, ship-owner, cargo owner and independent experts from the list maintained by the International Maritime Organization (excluding cases of extreme urgency requiring measures to be taken immediately);
 Use its best endeavours to avoid any risk to human life and to afford persons in distress any assistance which they may need, and in appropriate cases to facilitate the repatriation of ships crews;
 Notify all interested States, owners of ships and cargoes and the IMO of all measures taken;
 Ensure that all measures are proportionate to actual or threatened damage;
 Pay compensation to the extent of the damage caused by measures which exceed those reasonably necessary to achieve the end.

References

Further reading 
 Emanuelli, Claude C. The Right of Intervention of Coastal States on the High Seas in Cases of Pollution Casualties. 25 U.N.B.L.J. 79 (1976). Snapshot.
 Dzidzornu, David M. Tsamenyi, B. Martin. Enhancing International Control of Vessel-Source Oil Pollution under the Law of the Sea Convention, 1982: A Reassessment. 10 U. Tas. L. Rev. 269 (1990–1991)

External links 
 International Convention Relating to Intervention on the High Seas in Cases of Oil Pollution Casualties at the United Nations
 Summary of the INTERVENTION Convention  at the International Maritime Organization

Environmental treaties
International Convention Relating to Intervention on the High Seas in Cases of Oil Pollution Casualties
International Convention Relating to Intervention on the High Seas in Cases of Oil Pollution Casualties
Law of the sea treaties
International Convention Relating to Intervention on the High Seas in Cases of Oil Pollution Casualties
Treaties concluded in 1969
Treaties entered into force in 1975
1975 in the environment
Treaties of Algeria
Treaties of Angola
Treaties of Argentina
Treaties of Australia
Treaties of the Bahamas
Treaties of Bangladesh
Treaties of Barbados
Treaties of Belgium
Treaties of Benin
Treaties of Brazil
Treaties of the People's Republic of Bulgaria
Treaties of Cameroon
Treaties of Chile
Treaties of the People's Republic of China
Treaties of the Republic of the Congo
Treaties of Ivory Coast
Treaties of Croatia
Treaties of Cuba
Treaties of Denmark
Treaties of Djibouti
Treaties of the Dominican Republic
Treaties of Ecuador
Treaties of Egypt
Treaties of Equatorial Guinea
Treaties of Estonia
Treaties of Fiji
Treaties of Finland
Treaties of France
Treaties of Gabon
Treaties of Georgia (country)
Treaties of West Germany
Treaties of East Germany
Treaties of Ghana
Treaties of Guyana
Treaties of Iceland
Treaties of India
Treaties of Iran
Treaties of Ireland
Treaties of Italy
Treaties of Jamaica
Treaties of Japan
Treaties of Kuwait
Treaties of Latvia
Treaties of Lebanon
Treaties of Liberia
Treaties of the Marshall Islands
Treaties of Mauritania
Treaties of Mauritius
Treaties of Mexico
Treaties of Monaco
Treaties of Morocco
Treaties of Montenegro
Treaties of Namibia
Treaties of the Netherlands
Treaties of New Zealand
Treaties of Nicaragua
Treaties of Nigeria
Treaties of Norway
Treaties of Pakistan
Treaties of Oman
Treaties of Panama
Treaties of Papua New Guinea
Treaties of the Polish People's Republic
Treaties of Portugal
Treaties of Qatar
Treaties of the Soviet Union
Treaties of Saint Kitts and Nevis
Treaties of Saint Lucia
Treaties of Saint Vincent and the Grenadines
Treaties of Senegal
Treaties of Serbia and Montenegro
Treaties of Slovenia
Treaties of South Africa
Treaties of Francoist Spain
Treaties of Sri Lanka
Treaties of Suriname
Treaties of Sweden
Treaties of Switzerland
Treaties of Syria
Treaties of Togo
Treaties of Tonga
Treaties of Trinidad and Tobago
Treaties of Tunisia
Treaties of Ukraine
Treaties of the United Arab Emirates
Treaties of the United Kingdom
Treaties of Tanzania
Treaties of the United States
Treaties of Vanuatu
Treaties of the Yemen Arab Republic
Treaties of Yugoslavia
1969 in Belgium
Treaties extended to Bermuda
Treaties extended to Anguilla
Treaties extended to the British Antarctic Territory
Treaties extended to the British Virgin Islands
Treaties extended to the Cayman Islands
Treaties extended to the Falkland Islands
Treaties extended to Montserrat
Treaties extended to the Pitcairn Islands
Treaties extended to Saint Helena, Ascension and Tristan da Cunha
Treaties extended to the Turks and Caicos Islands
Treaties extended to Akrotiri and Dhekelia
Treaties extended to the Isle of Man
Treaties extended to Puerto Rico
Treaties extended to Guam
Treaties extended to the United States Virgin Islands
Treaties extended to American Samoa
Treaties extended to the Netherlands Antilles
Treaties extended to Aruba
Treaties extended to British Hong Kong
Treaties extended to the Panama Canal Zone
Treaties extended to the Trust Territory of the Pacific Islands
Treaties extended to Macau
Treaties extended to Surinam (Dutch colony)